Qeshlaq-e Hadli (also Romanized as Qeshlāq-e Hadlī) is a village in Anjirlu Rural District, in the Central District of Bileh Savar County, Ardabil Province, Iran. At the 2006 census, its population was 32, in 7 families.

References 

Towns and villages in Bileh Savar County